The silver hatchet chela (Chela cachius) is a danionins fish in the family Cyprinidae. Endemic in South Asia, it is found in Pakistan, India, Bangladesh and Myanmar.

References

Chela (fish)
Cyprinid fish of Asia
Fish described in 1822